Yunxiao County is a county of Zhangzhou prefecture level city, in the south of Fujian province, People's Republic of China. The county had a population of 415,835 according to the 2010 Census.

The county postcode is 363300 and its telephone area code is 0596.

History
Yunxiao County, located on the Zhangjiang River on the way from Zhangpu County to Dongshan Island, was the earliest seat of the government of Zhangzhou.

Economy
Minerals such as gold, zinc, silver and aluminum, granite, porcelain clay, and sea salt are mined in the county.

Major agricultural products in Yunxiao County include seed oil, sugar, vegetables, tea, and fruits, particularly loquat and lychee.

As of 2009, the county is also the source of half of China's production of counterfeit cigarettes, producing about 400 billion cigarettes a year (whereas all legal cigarette business is state-owned and state-controlled). Yunxiao is reported to contain some 200 illicit cigarette factories beneath buildings or in the hills.

Administrative divisions
Yunxiao County oversees six towns, three townships, and two . The county government is seated in the town of Yunling.

Towns
Yunxiao County oversees six towns. Of the six towns, three of which lie on National Route 324, and the other three all lie between this route and coast. The county executive, legislature and judiciary is seated at Yunling (云陵), together with the CPC and PSB branches.
 Yunling
 　
 
 　
 
 

Townships
Yunxiao County oversees three townships.
 
 
 

Development Zones
The county is home to two development zones.
 
 Yunling Industrial Development Zone

Climate

Culture 
The famous , built to honor Chen Yuanguang, the founder of Zhangzhou, is situated in the county.

In the main hall is a statue of Chen Yuanguang in red armour and official crown with his heavy mustache and red face. Sculptures of his parents and wife are also located in the temple, hung on stone pillars detailed with praise for Chen inside the hall. The most festive period for the temple is on Chen's birthday (the 15th day of the second lunar month) and the anniversary of his death (the 5th day of the 11th lunar month). On both occasions the temple is packed with people burning incense and full-length operas that are performed in the square. Effigies of Chen and other deities are paraded down the streets to celebrate the occasions.

Transportation 
National Highway 324, and the Zhangzhou-Zhao'an portion of the G15 Shenyang–Haikou Expressway both run through the county.

References

External links
Yunxiao County on Fujian government website
https://web.archive.org/web/20070810093701/http://yunxiao.zzlz.gov.cn/default.asp

County-level divisions of Fujian
Zhangzhou